The Silverites were members of a political  movement in the United States in the late-19th century that advocated that silver should continue to be a monetary standard along with gold, as authorized under the Coinage Act of 1792. The Silverite coalition's famous slogan was "16 to 1" – that is, the ratio of sixteen ounces of silver equal in value to one ounce of gold, a ratio similar to that established in the Coinage Act of 1834. Silverites belonged to a number of political parties, including the Silver Party, Populist Party, Democratic Party, and the Silver Republican Party.

The Silverites advocated free coinage of silver.  They wanted to lower the gold standard of the United States to silver therefore allowing inflation of the money supply. Many Silverites were in the West, where silver was mined. Advocates predicted that if silver were used as the standard of money, they would be able to pay off all of their debt. The debt amount would stay the same but they would have more silver money with which to pay it.

The Silverites' main presidential candidate was William Jennings Bryan, whose famous Cross of Gold speech argued in their favor. He unsuccessfully ran for president several times.

See also
Bimetallism
Bullionism
Commodity money
Free silver
Monetary policy

References

Economic history of the United States
 
Metallism